Christine Kathryn Rankin (born Greymouth c. 1954) is a New Zealand politician and former civil servant who served as head of the Ministry of Social Development.

Civil-service career 
Rankin originally joined the Department of Social Welfare (as it was then called) in 1978 as a temporary clerk, following the break-up of her first marriage. Rising through the ranks, she became the head of the Department in 1998. Her time as head of the Department occasioned some controversy, with allegations of extravagant spending and of a management style akin to a personality cult. In 2001 she lost a high-profile Employment Court case after the Labour government decided not to renew her contract. She has since worked as a consultant and public speaker.

Political career 
In her 20s Rankin was a member of the Labour Party, serving as the Albany branch secretary.

In 2007 she was elected to the Auckland Regional Council, as the representative of the North Shore constituency. She gained appointment as a commissioner of the-then Families Commission in 2009; her term ended in 2013. At the 2010 Auckland local-body elections she stood in the North Shore ward where she finished fourth and was not elected, however she won election to the Upper Harbour Local Board and to the Waitematā District Health Board. She was re-elected to the health board and local board at the 2013 elections.

Rankin joined the board of the Conservative Party of New Zealand in 2012 and became the Party's CEO in 2013. At the 2014 general election she was a candidate for the Conservative Party in the Epsom electorate, and was also ranked second on the Conservative party list. However, the Conservative Party did not achieve the necessary 5% of the party vote to qualify for list seats, so she was not elected. She resigned from the Conservative Party on 23 June 2015 after losing confidence in the founder, Colin Craig.

On 7 September 2016, Christine Rankin testified in a defamation lawsuit brought by the New Zealand Taxpayers' Union founder Jordan Williams against the former Party leader Colin Craig. Williams had filed legal action against Craig after the latter claimed that Williams had lied when he said that Craig sexually harassed his press secretary Rachel MacGregor. During the trial, Rankin testified that Craig had disclosed details of his relationship with MacGregor and that this revelation had led her to lose confidence in Craig's leadership of the Conservative Party.

Rankin was appointed Deputy Mayor of the Taupo District Council in November 2019.

Personal life
Rankin was raised Catholic, and in 2005 converted to the Soka Gakkai International tradition of Nichiren Buddhism. She has two sons from previous marriages. In 2006 she competed on Dancing with the Stars.

References

Living people
New Zealand public servants
Year of birth missing (living people)
New Conservative Party (New Zealand) politicians
New Zealand Labour Party politicians
21st-century New Zealand women politicians
Auckland regional councillors
Unsuccessful candidates in the 2014 New Zealand general election
1950s births
People from Greymouth
Members of Sōka Gakkai
Converts to Sōka Gakkai
New Zealand Buddhists
Waitemata District Health Board members
Deputy mayors of places in New Zealand
Converts to Buddhism from Roman Catholicism
Converts to Buddhism from Christianity